Lee Konitz Meets Warne Marsh Again is a live album by American jazz saxophonists Lee Konitz and Warne Marsh recorded at Ronnie Scott's Jazz Club in 1976 and released on the Pausa label.

Reception

Scott Yanow of Allmusic wrote: "Their repertoire (common chord changes) and cool jazz styles are not that surprising but both of the saxophonists sound quite inspired to be in each other's presence; they always brought out the best in each other. The melodic and boppish improvisations reward repeated listenings".

Track listing 
 "Two Not One" (Lennie Tristano)  	
 "You Go to My Head" (J. Fred Coots, Haven Gillespie)
 "Star Eyes" (Gene de Paul, Don Raye) 	
 "All The Things You Are" (Jerome Kern, Oscar Hammerstein II) 	
 "My Old Flame" (Sam Coslow, Arthur Johnston)
 "Sound Lee" (Lee Konitz)

Personnel 
Lee Konitz – alto saxophone
Warne Marsh – tenor saxophone
Peter Ind – bass
Al Levitt – drums

References 

Lee Konitz live albums
Warne Marsh live albums
1977 live albums
Pausa Records live albums
Albums recorded at Ronnie Scott's Jazz Club